Mary Louise Curtis (August 6, 1876 in Boston, Massachusetts – January 4, 1970 in Philadelphia, Pennsylvania) was the founder of the Curtis Institute of Music in Philadelphia. She was the only child of the magazine and newspaper magnate Cyrus H. K. Curtis and Louisa Knapp Curtis, the founder and editor of the Ladies' Home Journal.

She has also been credited with funding many of the landscape improvements made to the inner waterfront of the Rockport, Maine village harbor during the early to mid-1900s.

Early life and first marriage
Aged 13, writing under her mother's maiden name (as Mary L. Knapp), she was one of sixteen people on the staff of Ladies' Home Journal in 1890, the first year of Edward W. Bok's long tenure as editor of the magazine. In 1896, at the age of nineteen, she married Bok, who was fourteen years her senior. The couple had two sons, William Curtis Bok and Cary William Bok.

Her husband retired from the magazine in 1919, and they spent their winters in Florida, where they built the Bok Tower Gardens near Lake Wales. The marriage of Mary Louise and Edward Bok lasted 34 years until his death in 1930.

Settlement Music School

She became involved with the Settlement Music School at the age of 48. At the time, the school was focused on providing musical training to young immigrants. In 1917, she made a gift to the school of $150,000 for a Settlement Music House. The music house's goal was "Americanization among the foreign population of Philadelphia." A close friend of the Bok family, pianist Josef Hofmann, played a recital at the school's dedication. Today, this facility on Queen Street in Philadelphia is known as the Mary Louise Curtis Branch.

Curtis Institute of Music
In 1924, she established the Curtis Institute of Music, which she named in honor of her father, who also had a great interest in music. After consulting with musician friends, including Josef Hofmann and Leopold Stokowski, on how best to help musically gifted young people, Mrs. Bok purchased three mansions on Philadelphia's Rittenhouse Square and had them joined and renovated. She established a faculty of prominent performing artists and made several gifts to the institute, eventually leaving it with an endowment of $12 million.

She was the chief beneficiary of her father's estate, inheriting assets estimated at $18 to 20 million when he died in 1933. At this time, she became the largest shareholder, director and a vice president of Curtis Publishing. She founded the Curtis Hall Arboretum at the family residence in Wyncote, Pennsylvania.

On Thursday evening, March 13, 1958, Philadelphia Art Alliance president Laurence H. Eldredge announced at the organization's annual dinner that Zimbalist had been awarded the alliance's Medal of Achievement for "advancement of or outstanding achievement in the arts."

The Research Studio and other philanthropic efforts
 She gave Andre Smith sufficient patronage to enable him to establish an artist's colony known as The Research Studio (now the Maitland Art Center) in Maitland, Florida. The two met through a mutual friend, stage actress Annie Russell, with whom he had worked in summer theater in Connecticut. Mrs. Bok had already served Russell as a patron, funding the Annie Russell Theatre at Rollins College, Winter Park. Mrs. Bok, in addition to her other philanthropic pursuits, funded Smith's artist colony, which they named The Research Studio. Built between 1934 and 1937 (with additional construction in the 1940s), The Research Studio was dedicated to what Smith inscribed in one of the courtyards: ''"The artist's job is to explore, to announce new visions, and to open new doors."

At the time of its opening (the first artists arrived in 1938, coinciding with an inaugural exhibition in the gallery space), it was one of the few art galleries in the state of Florida. Among the nationally prominent artists who lived and worked at the studio were Milton Avery, Ralston Crawford, Ernest D. Roth, Arnold Blanch, Doris Lee, and Elizabeth Sparhawk-Jones.

She also became known for purchasing and preserving important music manuscripts in order to bring manuscripts together in the collections of academic institutions, conservatories, libraries, and state archives in order to facilitate easier use of these resources by musicians and researchers.

Marriage to Efrem Zimbalist
In 1943, she married the director of the Curtis Institute, violinist Efrem Zimbalist.

Curtis Publishing
Together with one of her sons, Cary, she controlled 32 percent of Curtis Publishing Company through its final turbulent years. She held a seat on the board of directors but reportedly "rarely attended board meetings during these declining years - refusing either to sell the stocks they had held all their lives or to exercise the authority that those stocks gave them." She finally did resign her seat on the board of directors in 1967, a few years before the final dissolution of Curtis Publishing and her death.

References

External links
"Bok, Mary Louise [see also Zimbalist, Mary Louise Curtis Bok], 1941-1942" (founder's business and personal correspondence), Curtis Institute of Music, Philadelphia, Pennsylvania, retrieved online December 12, 2022.
"Mary Louise Zimbalist (previously Mary Louise Curtis Bok)," in "Eugene Ormandy papers," Kislak Center for Special Collections, Rare Books and Manuscripts, University of Pennsylvania, Philadelphia, Pennsylvania, retrieved online December 12, 2022.

1876 births
1970 deaths
Curtis family
Businesspeople from Massachusetts
American philanthropists
American magazine writers
Curtis Institute of Music people
American media executives
People from Cheltenham, Pennsylvania
Writers from Boston
Writers from Philadelphia
Mary Louise Curtis Bok